The Trump House is a farmhouse in Unity Township, Pennsylvania. The structure is painted on all sides with the American flag and was a support hub for the Donald Trump 2020 presidential campaign.

History
The house was painted and converted from an abandoned structure in early 2016, operating as a support hub for the Trump campaign in both 2016 and 2020. In early September 2016, Trump posted on Facebook about the house, including a picture of the structure.

In October 2016, a driver sued the owner of the house for distraction after being involved in a vehicle crash next to the structure.

Community reaction 

Residents of Westmoreland County have had generally mixed reactions to the structure. In 2016, Trump won the county by a margin of more than 30 points, significantly more than any Republican presidential candidate had garnered in decades. On a campaign tour of the area, Jill Biden stated that the local Trump supporters were "disillusioned" and that the Biden campaign was "not taking any vote for granted." Both Biden and Trump lawn signs can be seen throughout the area.

The house has been described as "a Mecca of sorts for the president's supporters," with hundreds of Trump supporters visiting the house each day. The building's owners give out free Trump campaign merchandise.

Design
The three-story house is painted on all sides with the American flag. A large sign facing the road reads "TRUMP 2020," with smaller lawn signs dotted around the property containing Trump campaign slogans. A -tall steel cutout of Trump stands outside the house.

See also
 List of things named after Donald Trump

References

Donald Trump 2016 presidential campaign
Donald Trump 2020 presidential campaign
Latrobe, Pennsylvania
Roadside attractions in Pennsylvania
Westmoreland County, Pennsylvania